The charming miner bee (Calliopsis scitula) is a species of miner bee in the family Andrenidae. It is found in Central America and North America.

Subspecies
These two subspecies belong to the species Calliopsis scitula:
 Calliopsis scitula lawae (Michener, 1937)
 Calliopsis scitula scitula

References

Further reading

 
 

Andrenidae
Articles created by Qbugbot
Insects described in 1878